Blue Suede Shoes is a 1980 music documentary film by Curtis Clark that combines archival film of early American rock 'n' roll pioneers of the 1950s (with footage of Bill Haley's 1957 British tour, an Eddie Cochran television appearance and late 1960s concert footage of Gene Vincent) and British singers Cliff Richard and Tommy Steele with material recorded at a 1979 rock 'n' roll revival weekender featuring bands and people following the scene (including Teddy Boys, motorcycle greasers and rockabilly adherents.

Synopsis
The documentary includes archive material from the 1950s plus later concert footage from Gene Vincent (1970). The film includes footage from a revival weekend at a holiday camp in Great Yarmouth, England. The weekend footage includes footage of shows by various bands of the period and after. The film concludes with a 15-minute excerpt from a March 1979 performance by Bill Haley and His Comets recorded during his "comeback tour" in London. Although Haley continued to tour and perform until May 1980, this was his final film appearance.

Featured musicians
Bill Haley
Ray Campi and his Rockabilly Rebels
Freddie 'Fingers' Lee
Kevin Carey
Eddie Cochran
Cliff Richard
Tommy Steele
Gene Vincent

References

External links

1980 films
1980 documentary films
British documentary films
Rockumentaries
1980s English-language films
1980s British films